Leonora Duarte (1610 – 1678?) was a Flemish composer and musician, born in Antwerp. She belonged to a wealthy Portuguese-Jewish family who were Converso, meaning they outwardly acted as Catholics while secretly maintaining their Jewish faith and practices. She was baptized on 28 July 1610.

Having been one of the six siblings, in the well known musical family of the Duartes, Leonora composed seven sinfonias which are apparently the earliest music written for viol by a woman in the 17th century.

The Duarte home was a center for music-making and had contact with many important families in the Low Countries and England, including one of the most influential Dutchman of all time in regards to art and culture, Constantijn Huygens. Duarte wrote for viol consort. Her surviving compositions include seven fantasies for a consort of five viols.[1]

Family 
Duarte belonged to a well-known Antwerp family of rich jewelers and diamond merchants of Portuguese-Jewish (Converso) origin. The Duarte family left Portugal and settled in Antwerp to escape the infamous Inquisition. Her parents were Gaspar Duarte and Catharina Rodrigues, and she had three sisters and two brothers.

Gaspar Duarte played the harpsichord and was musically trained (as his wife was, as well). But professionally he was a successful jewelry merchant, especially in diamonds, who built a career in commerce with his son, Diego Duarte. Gaspar was also very close friends with renowned makers of harpsichords, Ruckers and Couchet. The Duarte family residence at the Meir in Antwerp was a well-known centre for music and the visual arts. The correspondence of Leonora’s father and her brother Diego with Constantijn Huygens shows that there were frequent contacts with the cultural élite of the Low Countries and England, including Huygens himself and his sons Constantijn and Christiaan, and William Cavendish, Duke of Newcastle. In 1644 Nicholas Lanier visited the family when he was in voluntary exile, and in 1653 Anne and Joseph de la Barre paid a visit when travelling from Paris to Stockholm.[2]

Biography 

Duarte was a Jewish Converso born in Antwerp to a prominent family of merchants and art collectors who were friends of the keyboard-making Ruckers family, Vermeer, and possibly Rubens. Growing up as converso in her family’s home, there seemed to be an interesting balance of understanding her identity, both as a Jewish woman at core, but also as a Jewish woman composer during the Baroque period. On one hand, conversos were closely observed, while on the other hand, it seems her family, especially her father, made it be known that regardless of their practices, their family was successful and otherwise great patrons of the arts and culture. 
Duarte received a superb musical education that included instruction on viol, virginals, and lute, as well as lessons in composition. Her musical evenings at home with her siblings quickly became well-known ports of call for traveling diplomats and literati, among them Constantijn Huygens, Dutch poet Anna Roemers Visscher, composer Nicholas Lanier, and singer Anne de la Barre. Their family home was known for a remarkable appreciation for guests and personal musical performances by all members of their family.

Composer

As a young composer, Leonora Duarte wrote a set of seven abstract fantasies, written for five viols. These seven short pieces are in the late Jacobean style and called ‘Symphonies’. Her brother, Diego Duarte, set to music various poems by William Cavendish (1650s) and later the psalm paraphrases of Godeau (1673–85), which he dedicated to Constantijn Huygens. None of these works, possibly all for one voice with basso continuo, has survived today.

Leonora Duarte was never commissioned by the church or the court over her lifetime, but stood out in her musical family due to her compositional talent. Her father, Gaspar, likely wrote out the titles of each Sinfonia, yet we do not know who copied the music. Given the frequency with which women were tasked with music copying, it is possible that Leonora copied the works, herself.

Leonora was capable of combining her native talent with the latest ideas and theory in Italian and French music due to the rich traffic of visitors from all parts of Europe that regularly made it to the Duarte’s house on the Meir. Historical documentation provides ample evidence that the Duarte family entertained important relations with the great Dutchman, Constantijn Huygens. Influences can be noted and applied, regarding the Duarte family and their guests, who at one time included Dirk Sweelinck, son of Jan Pieterszoon Sweelinck, the Dutch composer whose work helped mark the transition between the Renaissance and Baroque periods of music.

Leonora’s seven short sinfonias reflect the creation and compositional workings of Baroque music within the domestic sphere, where it would have originally been heard and performed.

While the Duarte house on the Meir was demolished in the 19th century, one can visit the house of a neighbor of theirs, the Snijders & Rockox House. It was turned into a museum, with a music room featuring period instruments and sheet music from Leonora, as the Duartes and their neighbors were known to share music.

Death
It is unknown what month, or even year, of Leonora’s death but can be recorded around 1678. Leonora was one of three daughters of the Duarte family to die from Antwerp’s plagues. The year of her death is supported by city records of the event.

Her brother Diego died in 1691 without successors, which ended the Antwerp branch of the Duarte family.

Notes

External links
 Works of Duarte on IMSLP https://imslp.org/wiki/Category:Duarte,_Leonora
 https://academicworks.cuny.edu/cgi/viewcontent.cgi?article=4532&context=gc_etds
 https://web.archive.org/web/20080808121907/http://www.goldbergweb.com/en/magazine/composers/2000/06/506.php 
 http://www.essentialvermeer.com/music/duarte.html#.WP_A2yMrK2w
 http://www.oxfordmusiconline.com/subscriber/article/grove/music/41706
 http://www.metmuseum.org/blogs/met-live-arts/2016/sonnambula-leonora-duarte
 http://artsinitiative.columbia.edu/events/leonora-duarte-1610-1678-complete-works
 By way of a discography, a commercially available compact disc of Leonora Duarte's complete surviving works was released by the ensemble Sonnambula (directed by Elizabeth Weinfield) on the Centaur Records label 2019.  http://www.sonnambula.org/leonora-duarte-cd.html

1610 births
1670s deaths
Women classical composers
Belgian Sephardi Jews
Flemish Baroque composers
Jewish classical musicians
17th-century classical composers
Musicians of the Spanish Netherlands
17th-century Jews
17th-century women musicians
People of Portuguese-Jewish descent